Zhangye West railway station is a railway station located in China's Gansu Province, Zhangye City, Ganzhou District. It was put into operation on December 26, 2014. It serves the Lanzhou–Xinjiang High-Speed Railway with High Speed services between Lanzhou and Urumqi and conventional services connecting Urumqi to various cities in Eastern and South Western China. It is the second railway station serving Zhangye, with Zhangye railway station which serves the conventional LanXin Railway.

Scheduled services
There are 22 trains scheduled

References

Railway stations in Gansu
Railway stations in China opened in 2014